Andre Hall (born August 20, 1982) is a former American football running back. He was signed by the Tampa Bay Buccaneers as an undrafted free agent in 2006. He played college football at South Florida, where he was the school's all-time leading rusher until 2016.

Hall was also a member of the Denver Broncos, Chicago Bears, Houston Texans, and Omaha Nighthawks of the UFL.

Early years
Hall played high school football at Dixie M. Hollins High School in St. Petersburg, Florida. He led Pinellas County in rushing for 1,742 yards on 227 carries (7.7 avg.) and 26 touchdowns in 2000, his one and only season of high school football.

Professional career

Omaha Nighthawks
Hall was signed by the Omaha Nighthawks of the United Football League on August 25, 2010.

NFL career statistics

External links
Just Sports Stats
Houston Texans bio
South Florida Bulls bio

1982 births
Living people
Players of American football from St. Petersburg, Florida
American football running backs
South Florida Bulls football players
Denver Broncos players
Omaha Nighthawks players
Sacramento Mountain Lions players
Dixie Hollins High School alumni